NLV Pole Star is a lighthouse tender operated by the Northern Lighthouse Board (NLB), the body responsible for the operation of lighthouses and marine navigation aids around the coasts of Scotland and the Isle of Man.

Pole Star was completed in 2000 by Ferguson Shipbuilders on the River Clyde. She is the fourth NLB vessel to carry the name and replaced the 37-year-old MV Fingal. In memory of this vessel, Pole Star has a workboat onboard named Fingal.

Pole Star was joined by a new vessel,  in March 2007, which replaced the previous vessel of the same name. Although the headquarters of the NLB is in Edinburgh, both vessels can be serviced by a workbase in Oban on the west coast.

From March 2008, Sean Rathbone has been Master of the Pole Star.

References

Ships of Scotland
2000 ships
Lighthouse tenders of the United Kingdom